The Dark Cry of the Moon is a horror novel by American writer Charles L. Grant.  It was first published in 1986 by Donald M. Grant, Publisher, Inc. in an edition of 1,450 copies, of which 300 were signed, numbered and boxed as a deluxe edition.  The book is the second volume of an internal trilogy which is part of Grant's Oxrun Station series.

Plot introduction
The novel concerns werewolves in the Connecticut town of Oxrun Station.

References

Sources

1986 American novels
American horror novels
Werewolf novels
Novels set in Connecticut
Donald M. Grant, Publisher books